Tan Yan Xin (born 13 June 1993 in Kuala Lumpur) is a Malaysian professional squash player. She attended Bukit Jalil Sports School and was a Scottish Junior Open champion in the girls' under-11 event in 2003. She reached a career-high world ranking of World No. 69 in March 2009.

References

External links 

Malaysian female squash players
Living people
1993 births
21st-century Malaysian women